Major General Sir Frederic Manley Glubb  (19 August 1857 – 31 July 1938) was a British Army officer, who was a senior figure in the Royal Engineers during the First World War. He was the father of the Army officer Sir John Bagot Glubb ("Glubb Pasha") and of the racing driver Gwenda Hawkes.

Glubb was born in 1857, the son of Orlando Manley Glubb, an officer in the 37th Bengal Native Infantry. He attended Wellington College and then studied at the Royal Military Academy, Woolwich, from where he entered the Royal Engineers in 1877. He was promoted to Captain in 1888, and married Frances Bagot, daughter of an Irish rural landowner, the following year . In 1895 he was promoted to Major, and in November 1900 he was awarded the Distinguished Service Order (DSO) for his services in the Boer War in South Africa (1899-1900).

After the war, Glubb was appointed to Lieutenant-Colonel in 1903 and Colonel in 1906; in 1912, he became the Chief Engineer of Southern Command. On the outbreak of war, he was given a posting in the newly mobilised British Expeditionary Force, as the Commander Royal Engineers (CRE) of III Corps; this made him the senior engineering officer in the Corps, responsible for the defences and support of two infantry divisions. He served with the corps until 1915, when he was promoted to Major-General and made CRE of Second Army. He remained in this post for the remainder of the war, being mentioned in despatches eight times and awarded a knighthood.

References

1857 births
1938 deaths
Glubb
Knights Commander of the Order of St Michael and St George
Companions of the Order of the Bath
British Army generals of World War I
Companions of the Distinguished Service Order
People educated at Wellington College, Berkshire
British Army major generals